Liberiet is a building in central Lund, Sweden, south of Lund Cathedral. Originally used as a library, the building was built in the 15th century. Today it serves as a Pilgrim Center.

References
Carelli, Peter (2007). Det medeltida Skåne. En arkeologisk guidebok. Historiska media. sid. 140-141.

External links

Buildings and structures in Lund
Gothic architecture in Sweden